Associazione Calcio Este is an Italian association football club located in Este, Padua. It currently plays in Serie D.

History 
The club was founded in 1920.

Colors and badge 
Its colors are yellow and red.

References

External links 
 Official homepage 

Football clubs in Italy
Association football clubs established in 1920
Football clubs in Veneto
1920 establishments in Italy